Chesippus is a genus of flies in the family Tachinidae. In 2016 it was proposed to be a synonym of Smidtia by André César Lopes da Silva.

Species
C. notialis Reinhard, 1967

References

Exoristinae
Diptera of North America
Tachinidae genera